Trevor Lee Caddell (born September 30, 1993) is an American professional wrestler currently signed to WWE, where he performs on the NXT brand under the ring name Cameron Grimes. He is a former NXT North American Champion and was the final Million Dollar Champion.

He began to work on the independent circuit in 2009 as Trevor Lee, most notably in Pro Wrestling Guerilla (PWG), where he was PWG Tag Team Champion with Andrew Everett. In 2015, he began to work with Impact Wrestling, where he stayed for the next 4 years. He would become a three-time Impact X Division Champion, one-time  TNA World Tag Team Champion with Brian Myers. After leaving Impact, Caddell signed with WWE and was assigned to NXT under the name of Cameron Grimes.

Professional wrestling career

Pro Wrestling Guerrilla (2014–2019)

Caddell began his career working for numerous independent promotions under the name Trevor Lee, starting with CWF-Mid Atlantic in North Carolina. He then made his debut 
with Pro Wrestling Guerrilla (PWG) on March 28, 2014, at Mystery Vortex II, losing to Andrew Everett in a three-way match also involving Cedric Alexander. However, Lee received a big push in PWG, defeating the top names of the promotion. On July 26, 2014, at Eleven, Lee picked up a huge upset win by defeating three-time PWG World Champion, Kevin Steen in Steen's farewell match for the company. Lee was one of 24 participants in the 2014 Battle of Los Angeles tournament. Lee defeated Cedric Alexander in the 1st round and Michael Elgin in the quarter-finals, before ultimately losing to Johnny Gargano in the semi-finals. On October 17, 2014, at Untitled II, Lee defeated the longest reigning PWG World Champion in the title's history, Adam Cole. On December 12, 2014, at Black Cole Sun, Lee defeated yet another PWG World Champion, Chris Hero. On February 27, 2015, at From Out of Nowhere, Lee received his first shot at the PWG World Championship against Roderick Strong, but was unsuccessful in his attempt. On May 22, 2015 Lee and Andrew Everett won the 2015 DDT4 tournament, defeating the PWG World Tag Team Champions The Beaver Boys (Alex Reynolds and John Silver) in the finals to win the tournament and also the PWG World Tag Team Championship. On June 26, 2015, at Mystery Vortex III, Lee and Everett lost the PWG World Tag Team Championship to The Young Bucks, following outside interference from PWG World Champion, Roderick Strong. On July 24, at Pro Wrestling Guerrilla's 12 year anniversary show, Threemendous IV, Trevor Lee defeated Tommaso Ciampa via Small Package Driver after a hard-hitting match. He entered PWG's Battle Of Los Angeles tournament on the first night defeating Trent?. The second night he teamed up with Biff Busick and Andrew Everett to take on Mount Rushmore 2.0 (The Young Bucks and Super Dragon) on a six-man Guerrilla Warfare match, which his team lost. In the third night he lost in the second round of the tournament against Marty Scurll.

At PWG's All Star Weekend 11, he began to show villainous traits such as cheap shotting opponents before matches and insulting the crowd. He achieved victory on both nights defeating Will Ospreay on night one, and Matt Sydal on night two. He entered the 2016 Battle of Los Angeles and made it all the way to the finals, a three-way elimination match where along with Marty Scurll eliminated Will Ospreay before once again tapping to Scurll's crossface chicken wing submission. On February 18, 2017, at Only Kings Understand Each Other, Lee defeated Cody Rhodes. Following that Lee started a losing streak for the rest of 2017 losing to the likes of Lio Rush, Keith Lee, Chuck Taylor and Ricochet.

Lee later entered into the 2017 edition of the Battle Of Los Angeles, getting eliminated in the first round by Donovan Dijak. At PWG All Star Weekend 14, Lee was defeated by Rey Horus on night one but defeated Morgan Webster on night two. In the 2018 Battle Of Los Angeles, Lee defeated Marko Stunt in the first round, then Brody King in the second round, but lost to Jeff Cobb in the semi finals. On October 19, at Smokey and the Bandido, Lee defeated Darby Allin. Lee wrestled at PWG's Hand of Doom on January 18, 2019, against the current champion Jeff Cobb in a losing effort. Following the match, Lee gave a farewell address to crowd as he is headed to WWE.

Independent circuit (2014–2019)
Lee has also wrestled for other independent companies, including OMEGA Championship Wrestling, where on May 21, 2015, he won the OMEGA Heavyweight Championship in a triple threat match that included his mentor Matt Hardy. On February 27, 2016, Lee - while wrestling at a CWF Mid-Atlantic event - defeated Roy Wilkins in one hour and forty-five minutes (105 minutes) to win the CWF Mid-Atlantic Heavyweight Championship.

At All American Wrestling's AAW Showdown 2018, Lee defeated DJZ to win the AAW Heritage Championship. On April 7, 2018, Lee unsuccessfully challenged A. C. H. for the AAW Heavyweight Championship. On November 24, 2018, he wrestled ACH to a 60-min time limit draw for AAW. DJZ regained the Heritage Championship beating Lee on December 8, 2018. His first match of 2019 was a successful defense of his CWF Mid-Atlantic Heavyweight title against Cain Justice.

Total Nonstop Action Wrestling / Impact Wrestling

The Helms Dynasty (2015–2017)

Lee made his Total Nonstop Action Wrestling (TNA) debut on the August 12, 2015 episode of Impact Wrestling, where he teamed with Brian Myers as part of Team GFW and lost to The Wolves. On the September 2 episode of Impact Wrestling, Lee and Myers defeated The Wolves in a rematch to win the TNA World Tag Team Championship with help from Sonjay Dutt. The next week on the September 9, 2015 episode of Impact Wrestling, they lost the title to The Wolves. On October 4, at Bound for Glory, Lee and Myers had a rematch for the TNA World Tag Team Championship against The Wolves but were unsuccessful.

After a four-month hiatus; on the February 2, 2016 episode of Impact Wrestling, Lee defeated Tigre Uno to win the TNA X Division Championship with the help from his new manager Gregory Shane Helms. During the reign, he successfully retained his title against Tigre Uno in a two rematch, Eddie Edwards and DJZ. In April, Andrew Everett joined Lee and Helms, forming The Helms Dynasty. At Slammiversary, he lost his title against Eddie Edwards in a four-way who including Everett and DJZ. At Destination X, he lost a ladder match for #1 contendership to the X Division Championship. On October 2, at Bound for Glory, Lee unsuccessfully challenged DJZ for the X Division Championship. On the February 2, 2017 episode of Impact Wrestling, he defeated him in a ladder match to win the title for the second time. The following week, Everett was attacked by Lee and Helms, and kicked out of The Helms Dynasty. On the April 20 episode of Impact Wrestling, Lee lost the X Division Championship to Low Ki in a six-way match that included Everett, Dutt, Dezmond Xavier and Suicide.

The Cult of Lee (2017–2019) 
On the July 6 episode of Impact, Lee attacked new X Division Champion Sonjay Dutt after his match with Caleb Konley and stole the X Division Championship, declaring himself the new X Division Champion. He then began "defending" the X Division Championship against handpicked local competitors and even wrestled with the title around his waist. On August 17, at Destination X (2017), Dutt regained his title against Lee after interference from a returning Petey Williams. On the September 14 episode of Impact!, Lee would form an alliance with Konley, where he would help him regain the X Division Championship in a Falls Count Anywhere match. Lee would go on to recruit former Helms Dynasty teammate Andrew Everett to face Dutt, Williams and Matt Sydal on the October 5 episode of Impact! in a losing effort. At Bound for Glory, Lee successfully retained the title in a Six-way match.

On the November 9, 2017 episode of Impact, Lee would lose the X Division Championship against Taiji Ishimori. In January 2018, Lee and Konley would start a feud against The Latin American Xchange, defeating them on January 11, thus earning a championship match that they lose. At Redemption, Lee competed in a Six-way match which was won by Brian Cage. On the July 26 episode of Impact, Lee was defeated by Johnny Impact. On December 31, 2018, his contract with Impact Wrestling expired. To write him off television they did an angle where Killer Kross punched a concrete block through his face. This aired on the January 3, 2019 episode of Impact.

WWE

NXT beginnings (2019–2020)
After leaving Impact Wrestling, Caddell revealed on January 12, 2019, at a CWF Mid-Atlantic show, that he signed a contract with WWE. It was made official on February 11, 2019, as he began working at the WWE Performance Center. Shortly after, he started appearing at NXT Live events in the Florida area, and he made his Full Sail University debut in a dark match before the May 1 NXT television tapings, defeating Shane Strickland. In June, his ring name was changed to Cameron Grimes. That same month, it was announced that Grimes would compete in the NXT Breakout Tournament, where the winner would get an opportunity to challenge for any title in NXT. Grimes made his debut on the July 3 episode of NXT, defeating Isaiah "Swerve" Scott in the first round of the tournament. On the July 31 episode, Grimes defeated Bronson Reed to move on to the final round, but lost against A. C. H. on the August 14 episode.

On September 18, Grimes defeated Sean Maluta on NXTs debut on the USA Network. Over the next few weeks, Grimes would develop a winning streak, defeating the likes of Raul Mendoza and Boa. On the October 23 episode of NXT, Grimes was defeated by Matt Riddle. Grimes would begin a feud with Kushida when he attacked him backstage after losing to him. On the December 11 episode of NXT, Kushida cost Grimes his match against Raul Mendoza and would taunt him by stealing his signature hat. The following week, Grimes defeated Kushida to end the feud. After defeating Dominik Dijakovic on the February 26, 2020 episode, Grimes would issue a challenge to Keith Lee for the NXT North American Championship, which Lee accepted. He faced Lee for the title in a losing effort on the March 11 episode.

On the May 6 episode of NXT, he defeated Denzel Dejournette but was attacked by Finn Bálor after the match, who Grimes had called out earlier. The following week, Grimes defeated Bálor in a match following interference from Damian Priest. Grimes would go on to flaunt his victory over Bálor while mocking Priest for losing to Bálor at TakeOver: In Your House and calling him a loser, which led to Priest attacking him backstage. On the June 17 episode of NXT, Priest found the tires of his Dodge Challenger punctured, which turned out to be done by Grimes, who once again mocked Priest. Priest would challenge Grimes to a match the following week. Prior to the match, Priest was attacked and came into the match injured, giving Grimes the victory. A rematch was scheduled on the June 24 episode of NXT in which Grimes lost. On the August 12 episode, Grimes defeated Velveteen Dream and Kushida to qualify for the NXT North American Championship ladder match at TakeOver XXX. At the event, Grimes was unsuccessful in capturing the title.

On the September 23 episode of NXT, Grimes competed in the first ever Gauntlet Eliminator match to determine the #1 contender for the NXT Championship at TakeOver 31 against Finn Bálor, losing to Kyle O'Reilly. Grimes then entered a feud with Dexter Lumis, attacking him on the October 7 episode of NXT, after his match with Austin Theory for disrespecting him last week. After distracting him during his North American title match against Damian Priest the following week, Grimes was put in a Haunted House of Terror match against Lumis on October 28 at Halloween Havoc, losing to him in the ring by submission. On the November 11 episode of NXT, Grimes interfered in Lumis's match against Timothy Thatcher, subsequently wrapping his head in a burlap sack and attacking him. The following week, they faced off in a blindfold match, which ended in an apparent no contest after Grimes unknowingly knocked the referee unconscious and eventually ran off. He would lose to Lumis again in a strap match on December 6 at TakeOver: WarGames. On the December 9 episode of NXT, Grimes was defeated by Tommaso Ciampa and attacked by Timothy Thatcher after the match because Grimes had angrily questioned Thatcher about being at ringside. It was announced the following week that Grimes was out injured for four to six weeks after Thatcher's attack. This was used to write him off television as Grimes legitimately needed arthroscopic knee surgery.

The Richest Man In NXT (2021–2022)
Grimes returned on the February 10, 2021 episode of NXT with a new gimmick as he claimed to have become a GameStop investor during his time away (in reference to the GameStop stock rise) thus making him the "richest man in NXT." He then failed to win a gauntlet match at TakeOver: Stand & Deliver for a future North American Championship match. On the April 27 episode of NXT, Grimes began a feud with WWE Hall of Famer Ted DiBiase after encountering him in a jewelry store over their watches. Over the next few weeks, "The Million Dollar Man" would continue to one-up Grimes, outbidding him in various purchases, and would end up costing Grimes a match to Jake Atlas on May 18. The two then had a "Million Dollar Face-Off" on the May 25 episode where L. A. Knight attacked Grimes and aligned himself with DiBiase, turning Grimes into a babyface in the process. On the June 8 episode, DiBiase reintroduced the Million Dollar Championship and announced that the winner of a ladder match between Grimes and Knight at TakeOver: In Your House would win the title, where Grimes was unsuccessful. On the following episode of NXT, Grimes saved DiBiase from an attack by Knight further signaling his face turn. Grimes would subsequently challenge Knight to a rematch for the title at The Great American Bash, under the stipulation that if he loses, he will be forced to become Knight's butler. At the event, Grimes failed to win the title and as a result, was forced to become Knight's butler. At NXT Takeover 36 Cameron Grimes faced L. A. Knight for the Million Dollar Championship where if he loses Ted DiBiase becomes L. A. Knight's butler. Grimes defeated Knight at the event and won his first Million Dollar Championship. On August 24, the storyline finally came to a conclusion on NXT, as they talked about Grimes’ journey to the title and how he was now headed "Straight to the moon!". The celebration ended with fake $100 bills with Grimes’ face raining down over the Capitol Wrestling Center.

A segment later aired with Grimes seeing The Million Dollar Man to his limousine in the parking lot, to say their goodbyes. Grimes gave the Million Dollar Title back to DiBiase, but Ted handed it back and said he wanted Grimes to have the strap so he thinks of their partnership and what they accomplished when he looks at it. Grimes took the title back, but noticed how it felt lighter, and was made out of a different material. Grimes looked on the back of the title and confirmed that Ted switched the belts out, giving him a WWE Shop replica to keep. DiBiase drove away while doing his signature laugh, while Grimes also laughed to end the segment.

NXT North American Champion and various feuds (2022–present)
Grimes faced Carmelo Hayes for the NXT North American Championship at the Vengeance Day special episode on February 15, 2022, and lost. He would win the NXT North American Championship on April 2, 2022 at NXT Stand & Deliver, by defeating Carmelo Hayes, Santos Escobar, Solo Sikoa and Grayson Waller in a fatal five-way ladder match. He made his first successful title defense against Solo Sikoa on the April 12 episode of NXT 2.0. Grimes would make another successful title defense in a Triple Threat match at NXT Spring Breakin' against Carmelo Hayes and Solo Sikoa. At NXT In Your House, Grimes lost the North American Championship to Hayes, ending his reign at 63 days. Grimes then entered a rivalry with NXT Champion Bron Breakker, which culminated in a championship title match at NXT: The Great American Bash, where Grimes failed to win the NXT Championship. On the July 12 edition of NXT 2.0, Grimes would cut an emotional promo, only for JD McDonagh to interrupt and attack him. However, Grimes would retaliate, thus setting up a match for the following week which he lost.  Shortly after, he entered a feud with Joe Gacy as the latter claimed that he could be his father figure as Grimes lost his real life father years prior. During this rivalry, the debuting Ava Raine would join Schism and cost Grimes in his final match with Gacy on the November 8th episode of NXT.

Personal life
Caddell's father, Tracey Caddell, was a professional wrestler and promoter, who died on July 29, 2018.

Championships and accomplishments

All American Wrestling
 AAW Heritage Championship (1 time)
AAW Tag Team Championship (1 time) – with Andrew Everett
Carolina Wrestling Federation Mid-Atlantic
CWF Mid-Atlantic Heavyweight Championship (1 time)
CWF Mid-Atlantic Rising Generation League Championship (1 time)
CWF Mid-Atlantic Tag Team Championship (1 time) – with Chet Sterling
CWF Mid-Atlantic Television Championship (2 times)
PWI Ultra J Championship (1 time)
CWF Annual Rumble (2017)
Kernodle Brothers Tag Team Tournament (2018) - with Chet Sterling
OMEGA Championship Wrestling
OMEGA Heavyweight Championship (1 time)
Pro Wrestling Guerrilla
PWG World Tag Team Championship (1 time) – with Andrew Everett
DDT4 (2015) – with Andrew Everett
Pro Wrestling Illustrated
Ranked No. 61 of the top 500 singles wrestlers in the PWI 500 in 2016
Total Nonstop Action Wrestling / Impact Wrestling
TNA / Impact X Division Championship (3 times)
TNA World Tag Team Championship (1 time) – with Brian Myers
Race for the Case (2017 – Blue Case)
WWE
NXT North American Championship (1 time)
Million Dollar Championship (1 time, final)

Luchas de Apuestas record

References

External links

 
 
 
 

1993 births
21st-century professional wrestlers
American male professional wrestlers
Living people
Million Dollar Champions
Professional wrestlers from North Carolina
TNA/Impact World Tag Team Champions
TNA/Impact X Division Champions
NXT North American Champions
PWG World Tag Team Champions
AAW Heritage Champions
AAW Tag Team Champions